Atlético de Madrid B is a Spanish football team based in Madrid, in the community of Madrid. Founded on 17 September 1963, it is the reserve team of Atlético Madrid and currently plays in Segunda Federación – Group 5. They play their home games at Cerro del Espino Stadium.

History
The club was founded in 1964 as Reyfra Atlético O.J.E. when CD Reyfra (1963–64) and CA Getafe merged. In 1970 it absorbed Aviaco Madrileño CF, which was established in 1967 when Madrileño CF (1956–67) and AD Aviaco merged, became affiliated with Atlético Madrid and in 1970 changed its name to Atlético Madrileño Club de Fútbol.

In 1991, the club changed the name to Atlético Madrid B for the 1991–92 season. Having already played from 1980 to 1986 in Segunda División, the reserves fluctuated between that level and Segunda División B – created in 1977 as the new third division – in the following decades. In the 1998–99 season, the team (which featured Rubén Baraja, future Valencia and Spain star in central midfield) finished in second position in the second division, but was ineligible for La Liga promotion – Numancia gained the automatic promotion slot instead. The following year, they were administratively relegated as the first team went down from La Liga, and in 2000–01 they missed out on promotion in the play-offs but would have been ineligible in any case as the seniors failed to achieve the same goal (they went back up a year later).

 
The entire 2000s were spent in the third level, but several players continued to make the transition to the first team, including the likes of David de Gea, Álvaro Domínguez, Antonio López, Gabi, Mario Suárez, Koke, Ignacio Camacho, Saúl Ñíguez, Thomas Partey and Lucas Hernandez.

In 2020–21, a poor on-field season combined with reorganisation of the league structure meant that the team was relegated not to the fourth tier but the fifth (Tercera División RFEF), having only spent two seasons below the third level since their first few years of existence over 50 years earlier.

Naming history

Club Deportivo Reyfra (1963–1964)
Reyfra Atlético O.J.E. (1964–1970)
Atlético Madrileño Club de Fútbol (1970–1990)
Club Atlético de Madrid "B" (1990–1992)
Club Atlético de Madrid, S.A.D. "B" (1992–)

Season to season
As Atlético Madrileño Club de Fútbol (independent club).

As Club Atlético de Madrid "B" (reserve team of Atlético Madrid).

 11 seasons in Segunda División
 30 seasons in Segunda División B
 1 season in Segunda Federación
 12 seasons in Tercera División
 1 season in Tercera División RFEF

Current squad

From Youth Academy

Out on loan

Staff

Coaches

 Teddy Pacheco (1969–1970)
 José Antonio Olmedo (1970–1971)
 Ramón Cobo Antoranz (1971–1974)
 Paquito García (1975–1976)
 Máximo Hernández (1976–1978)
  Joaquín Peiró (1978–1985)
 José Ufarte (1985–1986)
 Iselín Santos Ovejero (1987–1988)
 Emilio Cruz Roldán (1988–1989)
 Josu Ortuondo (1989–1990)
 Antonio Seseña Fernández (1990)
 Antonio López Habas (1990–1991)
 Manuel Ruiz Sosa (1991)
 José Miguel Polo Lázaro (1991–1992)
 Jesús Tartilán (1992–1993)
 Emilio Cruz Roldán (1994–1995)
 Santiago Martín Prado (1995–1996)
 Carlos Diarte (1996–1997)
 Carlos Sánchez Aguiar (1997–1999)
 Fernando Zambrano (1999–2000)
 Carlos García Cantarero (2000–2001)(2001–2002)
 Luís Pereira (2002)
 Santiago Martín Prado (2002–2003)
 José Murcia (2003–2006)
 Manuel Romero Paz (2006)
 Alfredo Merino Tamayo (2006–2007)
 Abraham García (2007–2009)
 Antonio Rivas (2009–2011)
 Milinko Pantić (2011–2012)
 Alfredo Santaelena (2012–2014)
 Óscar Alcides Mena (2014)
 Roberto Marina (2014)
 Carlos Sánchez Aguiar (2014–2015)
 Roberto Fresnedoso (2015)
 Víctor Afonso (2015–2016)
 Óscar Fernández (2016–2019)
 Nacho Fernández (2019–2021)
 Antonio Rivas (2021)
 Luis Tevenet (2021–)

Honours
Copa de la Liga (Segunda División) (1): 1982–83
Segunda División B (3): 1988–89, 2000–01, 2003–04
Tercera División (1): 2016–17

Records

Top Scorers (All competitions)

Appearances (All competitions)

Stadium
Cerro del Espino Stadium is located in Majadahonda, Community of Madrid. It also serves as an habitual training ground for the main squad, and as the home ground of local CF Rayo Majadahonda (second division).

Besides, this facility hosts simposiums on rules of the National Professional Soccer League on stadia security.

Technical details:
Dimensions: 106x70 meters
Surface: Natural grass
Capacity: 3,800 spectators
Opening year: 1995
Services: Newsroom, radio booths and cafeteria of the club. There are also toilets and bars to the public
Address: Calle Moreras, s/n, 28220, Majadahonda (Madrid)

Notable players

Note: This list includes players that have appeared in at least 100 top league games and/or have reached international status.

 Keidi Bare
 Koldo Álvarez
 José Percudani
 Javier Pinola
 Ivan Rocha
 King
 Jean Dika
 Daniel Kome
 Pierre Kunde
 Kily
 Salomón Obama
 Andrés Robles
 Xu Xin
 Cedrick Mabwati
 Manny Rodríguez
 Lucas Hernandez
 Theo Hernandez
 Sadick Adams
 Thomas Partey
 Sekou Keita
 Frantz Bertin
 Yassine Bounou
 Gabriel González
 Ángel Guirado
 Marco Ferreira
 João Pinto
 Ibrahima Baldé
 Amath Ndiaye
 Veljko Paunović
 Đorđe Tomić
 Zvonimir Vukić
 Quinton Fortune
 Mario Abrante
 Carlos Aguilera
 Manolo Alfaro
 Javier Arizmendi
 Rubén Baraja
 Borja Bastón
 Ignacio Camacho
 Javier Casquero
 Domingo Cisma
 José Ramón Corchado
 Cuaresma
 Pichu Cuéllar
 Diego Díaz
 Álvaro Domínguez
 Gabi
 Gaspar Gálvez
 David de Gea
 Juan Carlos Gómez
 Ramón González
 Tomás González
 Quique Estebaranz
 Santi Ezquerro
 Chema Jiménez
 Roberto Jiménez
 Juanjo
 Juanito
 Julio Alberto
 Keko
 Koke
 Paco Llorente
 Antonio López
 Juanma López
 Armando Lucas
 Mané
 Javier Manquillo
 Roberto Marina
 Ángel Jésus Mejías
 César Mendiondo
 Jorge Miramón
 Manu del Moral
 Sergio Morgado
 Toni Muñoz
 Saúl Ñíguez
 Juanma Ortiz
 Juan Carlos Pedraza
 Rubén Pérez
 Julio Prieto
 Quique Ramos
 Tomás Reñones
 Abel Resino
 Ricardo
 Antonio Rivas
 Diego Rivas
 Nano Rivas
 Joel Robles
 Carlos Rodríguez
 Juan José Rubio
 Miguel Ángel Ruiz
 Salva Sevilla
 Roberto Solozábal
 Mario Suárez
 Luis Tevenet
 Óliver Torres
 Martín Vellisca
 Higinio Vilches
 Clemente Villaverde
 Yordi
 Kader
 Pablo García
 Marcelo Saralegui

References

External links

Official website
Futbolme team profile 

Atlético Madrid
Spanish reserve football teams
Football clubs in Madrid
Association football clubs established in 1966
1966 establishments in Spain
Segunda División clubs